Agonopterix ocellana is a species of moth of the family Depressariidae. It is found in Europe and was first described by Johan Christian Fabricius in 1775

Description
The moth is relatively easy to identify by the combination of black, white and rufous colours in the centre of the pale-sandy brown forewing. The wingspan is 19–22 mm. Meyrick describes it - The forewings are whitish-ochreous, slightly fuscous-tinged, more or less sprinkled with black;first discal stigma black mixed with red, preceded by a similar dot obliquely above and sometimes connected with it, second white edged with red; between and above these a dark fuscous spot edged beneath with red; blackish terminal dots. Hindwings are fuscous-whitish. The larva is pale green; dots black; head yellow-brownish.
 
It is single brooded, hibernates as an adult and can be found all year round. Comes to light.

Egg
Eggs are laid on the shoots of many species of willow (Salix species) in May.

Larva
Full grown larvae are 17 mm long. The body of a later instar is apple green with a pale brown head. They feed in spun or rolled leaves of willows in June and July. In mid-Europe they also feed on birch (Betula species) and oak (Quercus species).

Pupa
Pupa can be found in the soil or amongst detritus in July and August.

Distribution
Found throughout Europe.

Notes

References

External links

 Agonopterix ocellana at UKmoths

Agonopterix
Moths described in 1775
Moths of Africa
Moths of Asia
Moths of Europe
Taxa named by Johan Christian Fabricius